Vandalic was the Germanic language spoken by the Vandals during roughly the 3rd to 6th centuries. It was probably closely related to Gothic, and, as such, is traditionally classified as an East Germanic language. Its attestation is very fragmentary, mainly due to the Vandals' constant migrations and late adoption of writing. All modern sources from the time when Vandalic was spoken are protohistoric.

The Vandals, Hasdingi and Silingi established themselves in Gallaecia (northern Portugal and Galicia) and in southern Spain, following other Germanic and non-Germanic peoples (Visigoths, Alans and Suebi) in c. 410 before they moved to North Africa in the  430s. Their kingdom flourished in the early 6th century, but after their defeat in 536 they were placed under Byzantine administration and their language likely disappeared before the end of the century.

Attestation
Very little is known about the Vandalic language other than various phrases and a small number of personal names of Vandalic origin, mainly known from documents and personal names in Spanish. The regional name Andalusia is traditionally believed to have derived from Vandalic, although this claim is contested. When the Moors invaded and settled on the Iberian Peninsula from the 8th century to the end of the 15th, the region was called .

The same phrase appears in  15 by Pseudo-Augustine: "".

The epigram  in the Latin Anthology, of North African origin and disputed date, contains a fragment in a Germanic language that some authors believe to be Vandalic, although the fragment itself refers to the language as "Gothic". This may be because both languages were East Germanic and closely related; scholars have pointed out in this context that Procopius refers to the Goths, Vandals, Visigoths, and Gepids as "Gothic nations" and opines that they "are all of the Arian faith, and have one language called Gothic". The fragment reads:

The tables below show various Vandalic words, phrases and forms that survive in (or as) names and various Latin texts. The majority of these were taken from Nicoletta Francovich Onesti's "Tracing the Language of the Vandals" (2015).

Grammar 
Very little is known about Vandalic grammar, but some things can be extracted from Vandalic names.

Phonology and sound changes 
The phonological features of Vandalic are similar to those of Gothic.

Vowels

The Proto-Germanic long vowel *ē is often preserved in Vandalic names, but it could become i when unstressed: , .

The Proto-Germanic short vowel *e turned into i in Vandalic when it was not preceded by *. For example,  contains -i because g precedes the vowel, but  retains the *e since r precedes the vowel.

The Proto-Germanic diphthong *eu tends to come down to Vandalic as eu.

Consonants

The Proto-Germanic *z is also preserved in the language as a sibilant (always found written s or as part of x), as opposed to having undergone rhotacism as it has in North or West Germanic. For example, compare the Vandalic form  (as in ) 'spear' to Old English .

However, royal names on Vandal coins use a conservative official spelling, with the h always being written.

The Proto-Germanic cluster *-ww- can be found strengthened to -g.

Declension and word-formation 
The original Proto-Germanic *-z used to mark the nominative masculine singular in nominals, which was lost in West Germanic early on, is attested within some preserved Vandalic forms as -s or as part of -x (occasionally found Romanized in some name attestations as -us). This marker is potentially to be deemed an archaic feature since it is lost in most words, with complete lost within Ostrogothic names from the 6th century onward.

Similar to Gothic, Vandalic does not seem to have i-umlaut.

The epithet  'king of the Vandals' gives possible attestation of a genitive plural ending  (cf. Gothic -ē), albeit written as i within this form. Old Germanic languages outside of East Germanic have -a (as in Old English and Old Norse) or -o (as in Old Dutch or Old High German) as their equivalents of this ending instead; compare Old English  against the potential Vandalic form *.

Some elements found within names are attested in declined forms.

Latin influence 
 The Proto-Germanic fricatives *þ and *ð often turned into t or d, but there are also some names in which they were retained or otherwise represented distinctly: , . 
 Initial h- was also lost under Latin influence; however, it is still found included in the spelling of some royal names on Vandalic coins. 
 Vandalic names could contain Latin elements or suffixes (etc.)

See also
 Vandals
 Gothic language
 East Germanic languages
 Languages of the Roman Empire

References

Sources
Francovich Onesti, Nicoletta, Tracing the Language of the Vandals, excepted from: Francovich Onesti, Goti e Vandali  (2013), 179ff.

East Germanic languages
Extinct Germanic languages
Extinct languages of Africa
Languages extinct in the 6th century
Language